Ioan "Părintele" Sdrobiș (born 9 March 1946) is a Romanian former football manager. As a manager Sdrobiș was well known for promoting young players in the teams he trained and to be a team maker, hence the nickname, Părintele (The Father). Sdrobiș managed historical clubs in Romania as: Oțelul Galați, Selena Bacău, Universitatea Cluj, Ceahlăul Piatra Neamț, CSM Reșița and Jiul Petroșani among others. Sdrobiș is also known for making Cristian Chivu CSM Reșița's captain when he was still a very young player, giving him much confidence.

References

External links
 

1946 births
Living people
Sportspeople from Bacău
Romanian football managers
ASC Oțelul Galați managers
FCM Bacău managers
FC Universitatea Cluj managers
CSM Ceahlăul Piatra Neamț managers
AFC Dacia Unirea Brăila managers
CS Minaur Baia Mare (football) managers
CSM Reșița managers
CSM Jiul Petroșani managers
FC Vaslui managers
FCV Farul Constanța managers